The Volleyball 2019–20 V.League Division 1 Women's is the 26th tournament year and the 2nd top level women's tournament of the newly branded and reorganized V.League (Japan). It was held from October 12, 2019 – January 26, 2020.

Clubs

Personnel

Conferences 
The 2019-20 V.League Division 1 Women will be divided into two conferences of six teams each: Premier and Star.

Foreign players
The total number of foreign players is restricted to one per club world wide, and one per club from ASEAN nations.

Transfer players

Stadiums

Schedule 
Regular Round begins October 12, 2019 (Saturday) and ends December 29, 2019 (Sunday). Matches are played every Saturday and Sunday.

The Empress' Cup Final Round which has usually been contested during the last week of December is scheduled for March 25–29, 2020 -- after the season is over.

 Each team will play twenty-one matches: 
each in-conference rival three times (IC--15 matches)
each out-of-conference rival once (AC Warfare--6 matches)
 Regular Season is divided into four legs:
IC Leg 1: October 12–27, 2019
IC Leg 2: November 2–17, 2019
AC Warfare Leg: November 23 – December 8, 2019
IC Leg 3: December 14–29, 2019
 Final Stage begins January 11, 2020 (Sat) and ends January 26, 2020 (Sun):
Final 8: January 11, 2020 (Sat) – January 19, 2020 (Sun)
Challenge 4: January 11, 2020 (Sat) – January 13, 2020 (Mon)
Semifinals: January 25, 2020 (Sat)
Final & 3rd-place match: January 26, 2020 (Sun)
 V1-V2 Promotion-Relegation Matches:
February 22–23, 2020 (Sat–Sun)
 Empress' Cup Final Round:
March 25–29, 2020

Season standing procedure 
The 2019-20 V.League Season brings new rules for how teams will be ranked for the Regular Round. 

Previously teams were ranked by:
Points ->Wins ->Set Percentage ->Scoring Rate

Beginning with the 2019-20 season teams will be ranked in the Regular Round by:
Wins ->Points ->Set Percentage ->Scoring Rate

 Teams will be ranked by the number of victories achieved throughout the Regular Round:
 In the event of a tie, the following first tiebreaker will apply: Total number of points gained per match as follows:
Match won 3–0 or 3–1: 3 points for the winner, 0 points for the loser
Match won 3–2: 2 points for the winner, 1 point for the loser
Match forfeited: 3 points for the winner, 0 points (0–25, 0–25, 0–25) for the loser
 If teams are still tied after examining points gained and the number of victories, then the results to break the tie will be examined in the following order:
Set quotient: if two or more teams are tied on total number of victories, they will be ranked by the quotient resulting from the division of the number of all set won by the number of all sets lost.
Points quotient: if the tie persists based on the set quotient, the teams will be ranked by the quotient resulting from the division of all points scored by the total of points lost during all sets.
If the tie persists based on the point quotient, the tie will be broken based on the team that won the match of the Round Robin Phase between the tied teams. When the tie in point quotient is between three or more teams, these teams ranked taking into consideration only the matches involving the teams in question.

Regular Round Results

In-Conference Leg 1

Standings after Leg 1 
Four teams from Premier Conference are 2 matches behind, and two teams from Star Conference are 1 match behind--due to cancelled matches opening weekend.
The five cancelled matches have been rescheduled for the end of the season:

Sat 4 Jan 2020: 12:00 Denso v Hisamitsu; 15:00 NEC v Okayama; 14:00 Toray v Saitama

Sun 5 Jan 2020: 12:00 Denso v Okayama; 15:00 Hisamitsu v NEC

In-Conference Leg 2

Standings after Leg 2 
Four teams from Premier Conference are 2 matches behind, and two teams from Star Conference are 1 match behind--due to cancelled matches opening weekend.
The five cancelled matches have been rescheduled for the end of the season:

Sat 4 Jan 2020: 12:00 Denso v Hisamitsu; 15:00 NEC v Okayama; 14:00 Toray v Saitama

Sun 5 Jan 2020: 12:00 Denso v Okayama; 15:00 Hisamitsu v NEC

Inter-Conference Leg

In-Conference Leg 3

Rescheduled Matches

Regular Round Final Standing

Regular Round Conference Champions 

 Star Conference -  JT Marvelous
 Premier Conference -  Denso Airybees

Final stage

Final 8
Teams will receive advantage points based on their regular season performance and add the Final 8 results
1st place finisher from each Conference - 3 points
2nd place finisher from each Conference - 2 points
3rd place finisher from each Conference - 1 point
4th place finisher from each Conference - 0 points

There will be two groups for the Final 8

Group A
Premier Conference 1st & 3rd place
Star Conference 2nd & 4th place

Group B
Star Conference 1st & 3rd place
Premier Conference 2nd & 4th place

3 matches in each group (round robin)
Top 2 teams from each group advance to semifinals. Points will determine final rank (different from Regular Round)

Tiebreakers for Final 8 (if tied on points)
Wins
Sets ratio
Points ratio

Final 8 Group A Round Robin

Final 8 Group B Round Robin

Semi-final

3rd-place match

Final

Challenge 4
The teams finishing 5th and 6th in their conference will be placed into the Challenge 4; 5th place teams receive 1 advantage point, 6th place teams receive zero.

A three team round robin takes place over three days. The top two teams stay in V1. The bottom two teams will playoff against V2 1st and 2nd place finishers in the V.Challenge Match:
V1 11th vs. V2 2nd
V1 12th vs. V2 1st
If the V2 team does not have an S1 license, they will not play the match.

V.Challenge Match
Held 22-23 February 2020

Participating teams: V1 11th and 12th place teams (3rd and 4th from the Challenge match); V2 1st and 2nd place teams
V1 11th vs. V2 2nd
V1 12th vs. V2 1st
If either of the V2 teams do not meet the 2020-21V.LEAGUE S1 license requirements, their prospective V.Challenge Match will not be held and the team will remain in V2 while the V1 team remains in V1.

There are no advantage points given. The matches will each be a two match series of 5 set matches (3,2,1,0 point system). The team with the highest number of wins will be the winner. If the teams split 1–1, Points will be the first tie-breaker 

Points are awarded as follows:
Win 3-0 or 3-1 = 3 points
Victory in 3-2 = 2 points
Defeat in 2-3 = 1 point
Defeat in 0-3 or 1-3 = 0 points

Ranking method:
Wins ->Points ->Set Percentage ->Scoring Rate

The Challenge Match between 11th place V1 finisher PFU BlueCats and 2nd place V2 finisher GSS Tokyo Sunbeams (ja) was not contested. The Sunbeams do not meet the V1 license requirements and remain in V.League Division 2. The BlueCats remain in V.League Division 1.

Final standing

Awards

Regular Round 

 Best Scorer
  Neriman Ozsoy (Toyota Auto Body Queenseis) - 523 points 
 Best Spiker
  Sinead Jack (Denso Airybees) - 52.9% success rate
 Best Blocker
  Hannah Tapp (Hitachi Rivale) - 1.08 blocks/set
 Best Server
  Andrea Drews (JT Marvelous) - 17.2% success rate
 Best Receiver
  Risa Shinnabe (Hisamitsu Springs) - 68.8% positive efficiency

Final stage 

 Most Valuable Player
 Andrea Drews (JT Marvelous)
 Best Outside Hitters
  Neriman Ozsoy (Toyota Auto Body Queenseis)
  Syuka Kaneda (ja) (Okayama Seagulls)
 Best Opposite
 Andrea Drews (JT Marvelous)
 Best Middle Blockers
 Sinead Jack (Denso Airybees) 
 Erika Araki (Toyota Auto Body Queenseis) 
 Best Setter
 Aki Momii (JT Marvelous)
 Best Libero
 Mako Kobata (JT Marvelous)

 Receive Award
 Kotoe Inoue (Denso Airybees)
 Best Newcomer Award
 Mayu Ishikawa (Toray Arrows)
 Fair Play Award
 Miwako Osanai (Hitachi Rivale)
 Excellent GM Award
  Akiyoshi Kawamoto (Okayama Seagulls)
 Director Award
 Tomoko Yoshihara (JT Marvelous)
 Matsudaira Yasutaka Award
  Tomoko Yoshihara (JT Marvelous)

All Star Game
Due to the coronavirus the event was cancelled

See also
 2018–19 V.League Division 1 Men's

References

External links
 Official website 

V.Premier League Women
V.Premier League Women
Women's
2019 in Japanese sport
2020 in Japanese sport